Huybrechts is a surname.

Notable people with the name include:

Sport
Hugo Huybrechts (born 1945), Belgian volleyball player
Kim Huybrechts (born 1985), Belgian darts player
Léon Huybrechts (1876–1956), Belgian sailor
Louis Huybrechts (1875–deceased), Belgian sailor
Maria Huybrechts (born 1930), Belgian swimmer
Ronny Huybrechts (born 1965), Belgian darts player

Other
Albert Huybrechts (1899–1938), Belgian composer
Daniel Huybrechts (born 1966), German mathematician

Surnames